The following highways are numbered 256:

Canada
 Manitoba Provincial Road 256
 Prince Edward Island Route 256
 Nova Scotia Route 256

Costa Rica
 National Route 256

Japan
 Japan National Route 256

United States
 California State Route 256 (former)
 Colorado State Highway 256
 Georgia State Route 256
 Indiana State Road 256
 K-256 (Kansas highway)
Kentucky Route 256
 Maryland Route 256
 Minnesota State Highway 256
 Montana Secondary Highway 256
 New Mexico State Road 256
 New York State Route 256
 North Dakota Highway 256
 Ohio State Route 256
 Pennsylvania Route 256 (former)
 Tennessee State Route 256
 Texas State Highway 256
 Texas State Highway Loop 256
 Farm to Market Road 256 (Texas)
 Utah State Route 256
 Virginia State Route 256
 Wyoming Highway 256